Cape St. Blaize Lighthouse is a lighthouse near Mossel Bay, South Africa.

Images

See also

 List of lighthouses in South Africa

References

Lighthouses completed in 1864
Lighthouses in South Africa
Buildings and structures in the Western Cape